Radyr Motive Power Depot was a traction maintenance depot located in Radyr, Cardiff, Wales. The depot was situated on the Merthyr Line and was near Radyr station.

The depot code is RR.

History 
Before its closure in 1965, the depot had an allocation of 0-4-2, 0-6-0, 0-6-2, 2-6-2, 2-8-2 and 4-6-0 steam locomotives.

References 

 Railway depots in Wales
Radyr
1884 establishments in Wales
1965 disestablishments in Wales